The 1922 Howard Bulldogs football team was an American football team that represented Howard College (now known as the Samford University) as a member of the Southern Intercollegiate Athletic Association (SIAA) during the 1922 college football season. In their first year under head coach Harris G. Cope, the team compiled a 2–6–2 record.

Schedule

References

Howard
Samford Bulldogs football seasons
Howard Bulldogs football